Buzánszky Jenő Stadion is a sports stadium in Dorog, Hungary. The stadium is home to the association football side Dorogi FC. The stadium has a capacity of 4,000. It is named after former Dorog player Jenő Buzánszky.

References

External links 
Magyarfutball.hu 

Football venues in Hungary
Dorogi FC
1921 establishments in Hungary
Sports venues completed in 1921